The year 1993 in film involved many significant films, including the blockbuster hits Jurassic Park, The Fugitive and The Firm. (For more about films in foreign languages, check sources in those languages.)

Highest-grossing films

The top 10 films released in 1993 by worldwide gross are as follows:

Events
 January 1 – China Film Import & Export Corporation ends its 40-year monopoly distributing all films in China, with 16 other Chinese film studios now responsible for distributing their own films.
 January 29 – Bram Stoker's Dracula opens in the United Kingdom setting an opening weekend record of £2,633,635 million.
 March 31 – Actor Brandon Lee is accidentally killed during the filming of The Crow.
 May 27 – Actress Kim Basinger files for bankruptcy after a California judge initially orders her to pay $8.9 million for refusing to honor a verbal contract to star in the film Boxing Helena. As a result, Basinger loses the town that she purchased in 1989, Braselton, Georgia, to her partner in the deal, the pension fund of Chicago-based Ameritech.
 May 28 – Produced by Hollywood Pictures, Super Mario Bros. opens, marking the first video game film released, starring Bob Hoskins as Mario and John Leguizamo as Luigi. The film would unfortunately end up grossing only $20.9 million domestically and receive negative reviews from critics.
 June 11 – The filmed version of Michael Crichton's novel Jurassic Park, a dinosaur epic with groundbreaking special effects directed by Steven Spielberg, breaks box-office records with a record $50 million opening weekend and goes on to become the highest-grossing film ever made with a worldwide gross of over $900 million.
 June 18 – Arnold Schwarzenegger's film career falters with the commercial disappointment of Last Action Hero.
 July 16 – Jurassic Park opens in Mexico and the United Kingdom and on July 17 in Japan, South Korea and Taiwan, setting opening records in each market.
 October 31 – Actor River Phoenix accidentally dies of an overdose during the filming of Dark Blood. The film was later completed and released in 2012.
 December 15 – Schindler's List, directed by Steven Spielberg, is released and goes on to win seven Academy Awards including Best Picture and Spielberg's first for Best Director.
 December 22 – Turner Broadcasting System acquired Castle Rock Entertainment.

Awards

1993 wide release films

January–March

April–June

July–September

October–December

Notable films released in 1993

U.S. unless stated

A
 12:01
Aankhen (The Eyes), starring Govinda – (India)
Abraham's Valley (Vale Abraão) – (Portugal)
Acting on Impulse, starring Linda Fiorentino, C. Thomas Howell, Nancy Allen
Addams Family Values, directed by Barry Sonnenfeld, starring Anjelica Huston, Raúl Juliá, Christopher Lloyd, Christina Ricci, Joan Cusack
The Age of Innocence, directed by Martin Scorsese, starring Daniel Day-Lewis, Michelle Pfeiffer, Winona Ryder
Aileen Wuornos: The Selling of a Serial Killer
Airborne, starring Shane McDermott and Seth Green
Al-Kompars (a.k.a. The Extras) – (Syria)
Alive, starring Ethan Hawke, Vincent Spano, Josh Hamilton
Amos & Andrew, starring Nicolas Cage and Samuel L. Jackson
Another Stakeout, starring Richard Dreyfuss, Emilio Estevez, Rosie O'Donnell
L'Arbre, le maire et la médiathèque (The Tree, the Mayor and the Mediatheque), directed by Éric Rohmer – (France)
Arizona Dream, starring Johnny Depp and Jerry Lewis
Army of Darkness, directed by Sam Raimi, starring Bruce Campbell and Embeth Davidtz
Aspen Extreme, starring Peter Berg, Paul Gross, Finola Hughes, Teri Polo

B
Baazigar (Player), starring Shahrukh Khan and Shilpa Shetty – (India)
Bad Behaviour, starring Stephen Rea and Sinéad Cusack – (U.K.)
Bad Boy Bubby – (Australia)
The Ballad of Little Jo, starring Suzy Amis, Melissa Leo, Carrie Snodgress, Heather Graham
Barbarians at the Gate, starring James Garner, Jonathan Pryce, Joanna Cassidy, Peter Riegert, Fred Dalton Thompson
Batman: Mask of the Phantasm, animated film directed by Eric Radomski and Bruce Timm
Beethoven's 2nd, starring Charles Grodin and Bonnie Hunt
Beijing Bastards (Běijīng Zázhǒng), directed by Zhang Yuan – (China)
Benny & Joon, starring Johnny Depp, Mary Stuart Masterson, Aidan Quinn
The Beverly Hillbillies, starring Jim Varney, Cloris Leachman, Erika Eleniak, Diedrich Bader, Dabney Coleman, Lily Tomlin, Lea Thompson, Rob Schneider
Bhaji on the Beach – (U.K.)
Blood In Blood Out (aka Bound by Honor), directed by Taylor Hackford, starring Damian Chapa and Benjamin Bratt
Bloom in the Moonlight (Waga ai no uta Taki Rentaro monogatari) – (Japan)
The Blue Kite (Lán fēngzheng) – (China)
Bodies, Rest & Motion, starring Bridget Fonda and Phoebe Cates
Body of Evidence, starring Madonna, Willem Dafoe, Joe Mantegna, Anne Archer, Julianne Moore, Jürgen Prochnow
Body Snatchers, directed by Abel Ferrara, starring Gabrielle Anwar, Forest Whitaker, Meg Tilly
Boiling Point, starring Wesley Snipes, Dennis Hopper and Viggo Mortensen
Bopha!, directed by Morgan Freeman, starring Danny Glover
Born Yesterday, starring Melanie Griffith, Don Johnson, John Goodman
Boxing Helena, starring Sherilyn Fenn and Julian Sands
The Bride with White Hair (Bai fa mo nu zhuan), starring Brigitte Lin and Leslie Cheung – (Hong Kong)
A Bronx Tale, directed by and starring Robert De Niro, with Chazz Palminteri, Lillo Brancato, Jr., Francis Capra, Joe Pesci

C
CB4, starring Chris Rock
Calendar Girl, starring Jason Priestley and Jerry O'Connell
Caro diario (Dear Diary), directed by Nanni Moretti – (Italy)
Carlito's Way, directed by Brian De Palma, starring Al Pacino, Sean Penn, Penelope Ann Miller, Luis Guzmán, John Leguizamo
The Cement Garden, starring Charlotte Gainsbourg – (U.K.)
The Cemetery Club, starring Ellen Burstyn, Olympia Dukakis, Lainie Kazan, Diane Ladd, Danny Aiello
Chai Gong (Mad Monk), starring Maggie Cheung – (Hong Kong)
Class to Remember, A (Gakko) – (Japan) – Japan Academy Prize for Picture of the Year
Cliffhanger, starring Sylvester Stallone, John Lithgow, Michael Rooker, Janine Turner
Coneheads, directed by Steve Barron, starring Dan Aykroyd and Jane Curtin
The Conjugal Bed (Patul conjugal) – (Romania)
Cool Runnings, directed by Jon Turteltaub, starring John Candy
Cop and a Half, starring Burt Reynolds
Crime Story (Zhong an zu), starring Jackie Chan – (Hong Kong)
Cronos, directed by Guillermo del Toro – (Mexico)
The Crush, starring Cary Elwes and Alicia Silverstone

D
Damini – Lightning, starring Rishi Kapoor and Sunny Deol – (India)
A Dangerous Woman, starring Debra Winger, Barbara Hershey, Gabriel Byrne, David Strathairn, Laurie Metcalf
The Dark Half, starring Timothy Hutton and Amy Madigan
Darkness in Tallinn (Tallinn pimeduses) – (Estonia/Finland)
Darr (Fear), directed by Yash Chopra – (India)
Dave, directed by Ivan Reitman, starring Kevin Kline, Sigourney Weaver, Frank Langella, Ving Rhames, Charles Grodin
The Days (Dongchun de rizi), directed by Wang Xiaoshuai – (China)
Dazed and Confused, directed by Richard Linklater, starring Matthew McConaughey, Ben Affleck, Parker Posey, Milla Jovovich
Deadfall, starring Michael Biehn and Nicolas Cage
Demolition Man, starring Sylvester Stallone, Wesley Snipes, Sandra Bullock
Dennis the Menace, starring Walter Matthau and Mason Gamble
Desperate Remedies – (New Zealand)
Digger – (Canada)
Dirty Weekend, starring Lia Williams and Rufus Sewell – (U.K.)
Dragon: The Bruce Lee Story, starring Jason Scott Lee and Lauren Holly

E
The Escort (La Scorta), directed by Ricky Tognazzi – (Italy)
La estrategia del caracol (The Strategy of the Snail) – (Colombia)
Extreme Justice starring Lou Diamond Phillips and Scott Glenn

F
Falling Down, directed by Joel Schumacher, starring Michael Douglas, Robert Duvall, Barbara Hershey, Rachel Ticotin, Frederic Forrest, Tuesday Weld
A Far Off Place, starring Reese Witherspoon
Faraway, So Close! (In weiter Ferne, so nah!), directed by Wim Wenders, starring Bruno Ganz, Otto Sander, Willem Dafoe, Nastassja Kinski – (Germany)
Farewell My Concubine (Ba wang bie ji), directed by Chen Kaige, starring Leslie Cheung and Gong Li – (China) – Golden Globe for Best Foreign Language Film and Palme d'Or
Fatal Instinct, directed by Carl Reiner, starring Armand Assante, Sherilyn Fenn, Sean Young, Kate Nelligan
Fearless, directed by Peter Weir, starring Jeff Bridges, Isabella Rossellini, Rosie Perez
Fiorile (Wild Flower), directed by Paolo Taviani – (Italy/France/Germany)
Fire on the Amazon, starring Sandra Bullock
Fire in the Sky, starring Robert Patrick and D. B. Sweeney
The Firm, directed by Sydney Pollack, starring Tom Cruise, Gene Hackman, Jeanne Tripplehorn, Holly Hunter, Wilford Brimley, David Strathairn, Ed Harris
Flesh and Bone, directed by Steve Kloves, starring Meg Ryan, Dennis Quaid, James Caan, Gwyneth Paltrow
For Love or Money, directed by Barry Sonnenfeld, starring Michael J. Fox, Gabrielle Anwar, Anthony Higgins
A Foreign Field, starring Alec Guinness and Leo McKern – (U.K.)
François Truffaut: Stolen Portraits (François Truffaut: Portraits volés) – (France)
Free Willy, directed by Simon Wincer, starring Jason James Richter, Michael Madsen, Michael Ironside, Lori Petty
The Fugitive, directed by Andrew Davis, starring Harrison Ford, Tommy Lee Jones, Joe Pantoliano, Jeroen Krabbé, Sela Ward, Julianne Moore

G
Gardish, starring Jackie Shroff and Amrish Puri – (India)
Gentleman, starring Arjun and Madhoo – (India)
Germinal, directed by Claude Berri, starring Renaud, Gérard Depardieu and Miou-Miou – (France)
Geronimo: An American Legend, starring Wes Studi, Gene Hackman, Robert Duvall, Jason Patric
Gettysburg, starring Tom Berenger, Jeff Daniels, Martin Sheen
Ghost in the Machine, starring Karen Allen
Godzilla vs. Mechagodzilla II (Gojira tai Mekagojira) – (Japan)
Golden Balls, (Huevos de oro), starring Javier Bardem – (Spain)
The Good Son, starring Macaulay Culkin and Elijah Wood
The Great Pumpkin (Il grande cocomero) – (Italy)
Gross Misconduct, starring Naomi Watts and Jimmy Smits
Groundhog Day, directed by Harold Ramis, starring Bill Murray and Andie MacDowell
Grumpy Old Men, starring Jack Lemmon, Walter Matthau, Burgess Meredith, Daryl Hannah, Kevin Pollak, Ann-Margret
Guelwaar, directed by Ousmane Sembène – (France/Senegal)
Guilty as Sin, directed by Sidney Lumet, starring Rebecca De Mornay, Don Johnson, Jack Warden, Stephen Lang
Gunsmoke: The Long Ride, directed by Jerry Jameson, starring James Arness, James Brolin, Ali MacGraw, Amy Stoch, Christopher Bradley, Marco Sanchez, Tim Choate, Patrick Dollaghan

H
Hard Target, directed by John Woo, starring Jean-Claude Van Damme, Lance Henriksen, Yancy Butler, Arnold Vosloo, Wilford Brimley
Hear No Evil, starring Marlee Matlin, D.B. Sweeney and Martin Sheen 
Heart and Souls, starring Robert Downey, Jr., Charles Grodin, Kyra Sedgwick, Alfre Woodard, Elisabeth Shue, Tom Sizemore, David Paymer
Heaven & Earth, directed by Oliver Stone, starring Tommy Lee Jones and Joan Chen – (United States/France)
Hercules Returns – (Australia)
Hocus Pocus, directed by Kenny Ortega, starring Bette Midler, Sarah Jessica Parker, Kathy Najimy
A Home of Our Own, directed by Tony Bill, starring Kathy Bates and Edward Furlong
Homeward Bound: The Incredible Journey, narrated by Michael J. Fox
Hot Shots! Part Deux, directed by Jim Abrahams, starring Charlie Sheen and Lloyd Bridges
The Hour of the Pig (aka The Advocate), starring Colin Firth, Ian Holm, Donald Pleasence – (U.K./France)
House of Cards, starring Kathleen Turner and Tommy Lee Jones
A House in the Hills, starring Helen Slater and Michael Madsen
The House of the Spirits, starring Jeremy Irons, Meryl Streep, Antonio Banderas, Winona Ryder, Glenn Close – (Germany/Denmark/Portugal)

I
I Love a Man in Uniform – (Canada)
In Custody (Muhafiz), directed by Ismail Merchant, starring Shashi Kapoor, Shabana Azmi, Om Puri – (India//U.K.)
In the Line of Fire, directed by Wolfgang Petersen, starring Clint Eastwood, John Malkovich, Rene Russo
In the Name of the Father, directed by Jim Sheridan, starring Daniel Day-Lewis, Pete Postlethwaite, Emma Thompson – (Ireland/UK/US) – Golden Bear Award
Indecent Proposal, directed by Adrian Lyne, starring Robert Redford, Demi Moore, Woody Harrelson
Indian Summer, directed by Mike Binder, starring Alan Arkin, Matt Craven, Diane Lane, Bill Paxton, Elizabeth Perkins, Kevin Pollak, Julie Warner
Iron Monkey (Siu nin Wong Fei Hung ji: Tit Ma Lau), starring Donnie Yen – (Hong Kong)

J
Jack the Bear, starring Danny DeVito
Le Jeune Werther (Young Werther) – (France)
Josh and S.A.M.
Joshua Tree (aka Army of One), starring Dolph Lundgren
The Joy Luck Club, directed by Wayne Wang, starring Rosalind Chao, Lauren Tom, France Nuyen
Judgment Night, starring Emilio Estevez, Cuba Gooding, Jr., Denis Leary, Stephen Dorff, Jeremy Piven
Jurassic Park, directed by Steven Spielberg, starring Sam Neill, Laura Dern, Jeff Goldblum, Richard Attenborough, Samuel L. Jackson, Wayne Knight

K
Kalifornia, directed by Dominic Sena, starring Brad Pitt, Juliette Lewis, David Duchovny, Michelle Forbes
Kanehsatake: 270 Years of Resistance – (Canada)
 – (Germany)
Khalnayak (Villain), starring Sanjay Dutt and Jackie Shroff – (India)
Kådisbellan (Slingshot) – (Sweden)
King of the Hill, directed by Steven Soderbergh, starring Jesse Bradford, Jeroen Krabbé, Elizabeth McGovern, Karen Allen
Kung Fu Cult Master

L
Last Action Hero, directed by John McTiernan, starring Arnold Schwarzenegger and Austin O'Brien
The Legend (Fong Sai-yuk), starring Jet Li – (Hong Kong)
Leprechaun, starring Warwick Davis and Jennifer Aniston
Libera me – (France)
Life with Mikey, starring Michael J. Fox and Nathan Lane
The Little Blonde Death (De kleine blonde dood) – (Netherlands)
Loaded Weapon 1, starring Emilio Estevez and Samuel L. Jackson
Lost in Yonkers, starring Richard Dreyfuss, Irene Worth, Mercedes Ruehl, David Strathairn
Love and Human Remains, directed by Denys Arcand – (Canada)

M
M. Butterfly, directed by David Cronenberg, starring Jeremy Irons and John Lone
Mad Dog and Glory, directed by John McNaughton, starring Robert De Niro, Uma Thurman, Bill Murray, David Caruso, Kathy Baker
Madadayo (Not Yet), directed by Akira Kurosawa – (Japan)
Made in America, starring Whoopi Goldberg, Ted Danson, Nia Long, Jennifer Tilly, Will Smith
Malice, directed by Harold Becker, starring Alec Baldwin, Nicole Kidman, Bill Pullman, Anne Bancroft, Peter Gallagher, Bebe Neuwirth, George C. Scott
The Man Without a Face, directed by and starring Mel Gibson, with Nick Stahl
Manhattan Murder Mystery, directed by and starring Woody Allen, with Diane Keaton, Anjelica Huston, Alan Alda
Map of the Human Heart, starring Jason Scott Lee – (Australia/U.K.)
Married to It, starring Beau Bridges, Stockard Channing, Robert Sean Leonard, Mary Stuart Masterson, Cybill Shepherd, Ron Silver
Matinee, directed by Joe Dante, starring John Goodman
Me and the Kid, starring Danny Aiello
Menace II Society, starring Tyrin Turner, Larenz Tate and Jada Pinkett
The Meteor Man, starring Robert Townsend
Money for Nothing, starring John Cusack
Moving (Ohikkoshi) – (Japan)
Mr. Jones, directed by Mike Figgis, starring Richard Gere and Lena Olin
Mr. Nanny, starring Hulk Hogan and Sherman Hemsley
Mr. Wonderful, starring Matt Dillon, Annabella Sciorra, William Hurt, Mary-Louise Parker, Vincent D'Onofrio
Mrs. Doubtfire, directed by Chris Columbus, starring Robin Williams, Sally Field, Pierce Brosnan – Golden Globe Award for Best Picture (Musical or Comedy)
Much Ado About Nothing, directed by and starring Kenneth Branagh, with Michael Keaton, Keanu Reeves, Emma Thompson, Denzel Washington, Robert Sean Leonard, Kate Beckinsale – (UK/US)
The Music of Chance, starring James Spader and Mandy Patinkin
My Favorite Season (Ma saison préférée), starring Catherine Deneuve and Daniel Auteuil – (France)
My Neighbor Totoro (English dub)
My Life, starring Michael Keaton, Nicole Kidman, Bradley Whitford, Michael Constantine, Queen Latifah

N
Naked, directed by Mike Leigh, starring David Thewlis – (U.K.)
Naked in New York, starring Eric Stoltz, Mary-Louise Parker, Jill Clayburgh, Ralph Macchio, Kathleen Turner, Tony Curtis
Needful Things, starring Ed Harris, Max von Sydow, Bonnie Bedelia, J. T. Walsh, Amanda Plummer
The Nightmare Before Christmas, directed by Henry Selick
The Night We Never Met, starring Matthew Broderick, Annabella Sciorra, Kevin Anderson, Jeanne Tripplehorn and Justine Bateman
Ninja Scroll (Jūbē Ninpūchō) – (Japan)
No More Mr. Nice Guy (Wir können auch anders ...) – (Germany)
Nowhere to Run, starring Jean-Claude Van Damme, Rosanna Arquette, Ted Levine, Kieran Culkin, Joss Ackland

O
Oglinda (The Mirror) – (Romania)
Once Upon a Forest, directed by Charles Grosvenor, featuring the voice of Michael Crawford – (UK/US)
Once Upon a Time in China III (Wong Fei Hung ji saam: Si wong jaang ba), starring Jet Li and Rosamund Kwan – (Hong Kong)
Only The Strong, starring Mark Dacascos
Ordinary Magic, starring Ryan Reynolds and Glenne Headly – (Canada)

P
The Pelican Brief, directed by Alan J. Pakula, starring Julia Roberts and Denzel Washington
A Perfect World, directed by Clint Eastwood, starring Kevin Costner, Eastwood, Laura Dern, Bradley Whitford
Philadelphia, directed by Jonathan Demme, starring Tom Hanks, Denzel Washington, Antonio Banderas, Joanne Woodward, Mary Steenburgen, Jason Robards
The Philadelphia Experiment II
The Piano, directed by Jane Campion, starring Holly Hunter, Harvey Keitel, Sam Neill, Anna Paquin – (New Zealand/Australia/France) – Palme d'Or award
Poetic Justice, directed by John Singleton, starring Janet Jackson and Tupac Shakur
Point of No Return, starring Bridget Fonda, Gabriel Byrne, Dermot Mulroney, Anne Bancroft, Harvey Keitel
Posse, directed by and starring Mario Van Peebles
The Program, starring James Caan, Halle Berry, Omar Epps, Craig Sheffer, Kristy Swanson
Public Access, directed by Bryan Singer
The Puppetmaster (Xi meng ren sheng) – (Taiwan)

R
Raining Stones, directed by Ken Loach – (U.K.)
The Real McCoy, starring Kim Basinger and Val Kilmer
Red Rock West, directed by John Dahl, starring Nicolas Cage, Lara Flynn Boyle, J.T. Walsh, Dennis Hopper
The Red Squirrel (La ardilla roja) – (Spain)
The Remains of the Day, directed by James Ivory, starring Anthony Hopkins, Emma Thompson, James Fox, Hugh Grant, Christopher Reeve – (UK/US)
Return of the Living Dead 3
Rich in Love, starring Albert Finney, Kathryn Erbe, Kyle MacLachlan, Suzy Amis, Jill Clayburgh
Rising Sun, directed by Philip Kaufman, starring Sean Connery and Wesley Snipes
RoboCop 3, directed by Fred Dekker, starring Robert John Burke and Nancy Allen
Robin Hood: Men in Tights, directed by Mel Brooks, starring Cary Elwes, Dave Chappelle, Amy Yasbeck, Roger Rees, Richard Lewis
Romeo Is Bleeding, directed by Peter Medak, starring Gary Oldman, Lena Olin, Annabella Sciorra, Juliette Lewis, Roy Scheider
Rookie of the Year, directed by Daniel Stern, starring Thomas Ian Nicholas, Gary Busey, Albert Hall
Roosters, starring Edward James Olmos and Sônia Braga
Ruby Cairo, starring Andie MacDowell and Liam Neeson
Ruby in Paradise, starring Ashley Judd
Rudy, directed by David Anspaugh, starring Sean Astin, Ned Beatty, Charles S. Dutton, Jason Miller, Jon Favreau

S
The Saint of Fort Washington, starring Matt Dillon and Danny Glover
Samba Traoré, directed by Idrissa Ouedraogo – (Burkina Faso)
The Sandlot, directed by David M. Evans
Sankofa – (Burkina Faso)
Say a Little Prayer – (Australia)
The Scent of Green Papaya (Mùi đu đủ xanh) or (L'Odeur de la papaye verte) – (Vietnam/France)
Schindler's List, directed by Steven Spielberg, starring Liam Neeson, Ben Kingsley, Ralph Fiennes – Academy and Golden Globe (drama) Awards for Best Picture
Searching For Bobby Fischer, directed by Steven Zaillian, starring Joe Mantegna, Joan Allen, Ben Kingsley, Laurence Fishburne
The Secret Garden, starring Maggie Smith – (U.K.)
The Sex of the Stars (Le Sexe des étoiles) – (Canada)
Shadowlands, directed by Richard Attenborough, starring Anthony Hopkins and Debra Winger – (U.K.)
Short Cuts, directed by Robert Altman, starring Tim Robbins, Andie MacDowell, Fred Ward, Bruce Davison, Robert Downey, Jr., Julianne Moore, Madeleine Stowe, Chris Penn, Lori Singer, Jack Lemmon, Lily Tomlin, Tom Waits
Sister Act 2: Back in the Habit, directed by Bill Duke, starring Whoopi Goldberg
Six Degrees of Separation, directed by Fred Schepisi, starring Stockard Channing, Will Smith, Donald Sutherland
Slaughter of the Innocents, starring Scott Glenn
Sleepless in Seattle, directed by Nora Ephron, starring Tom Hanks, Meg Ryan, Bill Pullman, Rosie O'Donnell, Rita Wilson, Rob Reiner
Sliver, directed by Phillip Noyce, starring Sharon Stone, William Baldwin, Tom Berenger
Smoking/No Smoking, directed by Alain Resnais – (France)
The Snapper, directed by Stephen Frears, starring Colm Meaney and Brendan Gleeson – (Ireland)
Sniper, starring Tom Berenger and Billy Zane
So I Married an Axe Murderer, starring Mike Myers, Nancy Travis, Amanda Plummer
Sommersby, directed by Jon Amiel, starring Richard Gere, Jodie Foster and Bill Pullman
Son in Law, starring Pauly Shore
Son of the Pink Panther, directed by Blake Edwards, starring Roberto Benigni
Sonatine, directed by and starring Takeshi Kitano – (Japan)
Seopyeonje – (South Korea)
Speak Up! It's So Dark (Tala! Det är så mörkt) – (Sweden)
Stalingrad – (Germany)
Strawberry and Chocolate (Fresa y chocolate) – (Cuba/Mexico/Spain)
Striking Distance, starring Bruce Willis, Sarah Jessica Parker, John Mahoney, Robert Pastorelli, Dennis Farina
Sunset Grill, starring Peter Weller and Lori Singer
Super Mario Bros., directed by Rocky Morton and Annabel Jankel, starring Bob Hoskins, John Leguizamo, Dennis Hopper, Samantha Mathis
Swing Kids, starring Christian Bale and Robert Sean Leonard

T
Teenage Mutant Ninja Turtles III
The Temp, starring Timothy Hutton, Lara Flynn Boyle, Faye Dunaway
The Thing Called Love, starring River Phoenix and Samantha Mathis
Thirty Two Short Films About Glenn Gould – (Canada)
This Boy's Life, directed by Michael Caton-Jones, starring Robert De Niro, Ellen Barkin, Leonardo DiCaprio
The Three Best Things in Life (De Drie Beste Dingen in het Leven) – (Netherlands)
Three Colors: Blue (Trzy kolory. Niebieski) – 1st of the Krzysztof Kieślowski trilogy, starring Juliette Binoche – (Poland/France/Switzerland) – Golden Lion award
The Three Musketeers, directed by Stephen Herek, starring Charlie Sheen, Kiefer Sutherland, Chris O'Donnell, Oliver Platt, Rebecca De Mornay – (UK/US/Austria)
Three of Hearts, starring William Baldwin, Kelly Lynch, Sherilyn Fenn
Tirangaa, starring Raaj Kumar – (India)
To the Starry Island (Geu seom-e gago sipta) – (South Korea)
To Want to Fly (Volare volare) – (Italy)
Tom and Jerry: The Movie, directed by Phil Roman, starring Richard Kind, Dana Hill, Anndi McAfee, Charlotte Rae, Tony Jay, Ed Gilbert, David Lander, Henry Gibson, Rip Taylor
Tombstone, directed by George P. Cosmatos, starring Kurt Russell, Val Kilmer, Sam Elliott, Bill Paxton, Dana Delany, Michael Biehn, Powers Boothe, Billy Zane
Trauma, directed by Dario Argento, starring Asia Argento, Piper Laurie, Brad Dourif
True Romance, directed by Tony Scott, written by Quentin Tarantino, starring Christian Slater, Patricia Arquette, Dennis Hopper, Christopher Walken, Gary Oldman, Michael Rapaport, Bronson Pinchot, Brad Pitt
Twenty Bucks, starring Brendan Fraser, Steve Buscemi, Elisabeth Shue, Linda Hunt
Two Cops (Tukabseu) – (South Korea)
Two Small Bodies, starring Fred Ward and Suzy Amis

U
Undercover Blues, starring Kathleen Turner and Dennis Quaid
Untamed Heart, directed by Tony Bill, starring Christian Slater, Marisa Tomei, Rosie Perez
The Untold Story (Bat sin fan dim ji yan yuk cha siu bau) – (Hong Kong)

V
The Vanishing, starring Jeff Bridges, Kiefer Sutherland, Nancy Travis
Les Visiteurs (The Visitors), starring Christian Clavier and Jean Reno – (France)

W
A Wall of Silence (Un Muro de Silencio), starring Vanessa Redgrave – (Argentina)
The War Room, directed by Chris Hegedus and D. A. Pennebaker
Watch It, starring Peter Gallagher and Suzy Amis
Wayne's World 2, directed by Stephen Surjik, starring Mike Myers, Dana Carvey, Christopher Walken, Tia Carrere, Kim Basinger
The Wedding Banquet, directed by Ang Lee – (Taiwan/United States) – Golden Bear and Golden Space Needle awards
The Wedding Gift (aka Wide-Eyed and Legless), directed by Richard Loncraine, starring Julie Walters and Jim Broadbent – (U.K.)
We're Back! A Dinosaur's Story, directed by Ralph Zondag, Phil Nibbelink, Simon Wells
What's Eating Gilbert Grape, starring Johnny Depp, Juliette Lewis, Mary Steenburgen, Leonardo DiCaprio
What's Love Got to Do With It, directed by Brian Gibson, starring Angela Bassett and Laurence Fishburne – Nominated for 2 Oscars, won the American Choreography Award
Where's God When I'm S-Scared?
When A Stranger Calls Back
White Wolves: A Cry in the Wild II
Who's the Man?, starring Doctor Dré and Ed Lover
Wide Sargasso Sea, starring Rachel Ward, Karina Lombard, Nathaniel Parker
Wilder Napalm, starring Dennis Quaid, Debra Winger, Arliss Howard, Jim Varney
Woman of Desire, starring Bo Derek
The Women from the Lake of Scented Souls (Xian hun nu) – (China) – Golden Bear award
Wrestling Ernest Hemingway, directed by Randa Haines, starring Robert Duvall, Richard Harris, Shirley MacLaine, Sandra Bullock
The Wrong Man, directed by Jim McBride, starring Rosanna Arquette, Kevin Anderson, John Lithgow
The Wrong Trousers, a Wallace and Gromit short – (U.K.)

Y
The Young Americans, starring Harvey Keitel – (U.K.)
Younger and Younger, starring Donald Sutherland and Brendan Fraser

Births
 January 5 – Franz Drameh, English actor
 January 7 – Yuta Nakatsuka, Japanese actor and dancer
 January 9 – Ashley Argota, American actress
 January 10 - Jacob Scipio, English actor and writer
 January 11 – Flora Cross, French-American actress
 January 18 – Morgan York, American actress
 January 19 – Gus Lewis, American-English actor
 January 26 – Cameron Bright, Canadian actor
 January 28 – Will Poulter, English actor
 January 29 - Lewis Pullman, American actor
 February 7
David Dorfman, American actor
Philip Wiegratz, German former actor
 February 12 – Jennifer Stone, American actress
 February 14 – Shane Harper, American actor
 February 19 – Victoria Justice, American actress and singer
 February 21 – Masaki Suda, Japanese actor
 March 4 -
Jenna Boyd, American actress
Abigail Mavity, American  actress
 March 11 – Jodie Comer, English actress
 March 15 – Alia Bhatt, British actress
 March 29 - Joe Adler, American actor
 April 7 – Yell Htwe Aung, Burmese comedian, actor, and model (died 2018)
 April 10 – Sofia Carson, actress, singer and musician
 April 14
Vivien Cardone, American actress
Graham Phillips (actor), American actor, filmmaker and singer
 April 26 - Ryoma Takeuchi, Japanese actor
 April 30 - Henry Zaga, Brazilian actor
 May 6 – Naomi Scott, English actress and singer
 May 10
Spencer Fox, American actor, singer and musician
Halston Sage, American actress
 May 11 – James Reid, Filipino actor  
 May 13 – Debby Ryan, American actress and singer
 May 14 – Miranda Cosgrove, American  actress, singer
 May 29 – Maika Monroe, American actress
 June 7 - Amanda Leighton, American actress
 June 9 – Danielle Chuchran, American actress
 June 11 - Sidhu Moose Wala, Indian singer, rapper and actor (died 2022)
 June 24 – Beanie Feldstein, American actress
 June 25 – Barney Clark, English actor
 June 26 – Ariana Grande, American actress, singer
 July 1 – Raini Rodriguez, American actress, singer
July 3 – Sarah Wiedenheft, Dutch-American voice actress
 July 9 – Emily Hirst, Canadian actress
 July 23 – Lili Simmons, American actress
 July 26
Elizabeth Gillies, American actress
Taylor Momsen, American actress
 July 31 – Christian Byers, Australian actor
 August 1 – Leon Thomas III, American actor, singer/songwriter, musician and dancer
 August 2 – Ryan and Kyle Pepi, American actors
 August 4 – Alan Shirahama, Japanese actor and DJ
 August 5 – Suzuka Ohgo, Japanese actress
 August 7 - Francesca Eastwood, American actress and television personality
 August 8 – Devery Jacobs, Canadian actress
 August 11 – Alyson Stoner, American actress
 August 12 – 
Imani Hakim, American actress
Hannah Quinlivan, Taiwanese-Australian actress and model
 August 16 – Cameron Monaghan, American actor
 August 18 – Maia Mitchell, Australian actress, singer
 August 26 – Keke Palmer, American actress
 September 1 - Alexander Conti, Canadian actor
 September 18 – Patrick Schwarzenegger, American actor
 September 22 – Chase Ellison, American actor
 September 24 – Ben Platt, American actor
 September 25
Greg Davis (actor), American actor
Zach Tyler Eisen, American former voice actor
 October 8 – Angus T. Jones, American actor
 October 9 - Autumn Chiklis, American actress and writer
 October 25
Bessie Carter, English actress
Rachel Matthews, American actress
 October 30 – Brett Kelly, Canadian actor
 October 31 – Letitia Wright, Guyanese-British actress
 November 8 - Jak Knight, American actor, comedian and writer (died 2022)
 November 16 – Pete Davidson, American comedian and actor
 November 22 – Adèle Exarchopoulos, French actress
 November 24 - Zoe Levin, American actress
 November 30 – Mia Goth, English actress
 December 8 – AnnaSophia Robb, American actress
 December 10 - Alicia von Rittberg, German actress
 December 16 – Stephan James, Canadian actor
 December 17 – Kiersey Clemons, American actress
 December 19 - Hermione Corfield, English actress
 December 21 - Vanessa Angel (Indonesian actress), Indonesian actress, model and singer (died 2021)
 December 22 – Aliana Lohan, American actress
 December 24 - Millie Brady, English actress and model
 December 27 – Olivia Cooke, English actress

Deaths

Film debuts
Joey Lauren Adams – Coneheads
Jennifer Aniston – Leprechaun
Diedrich Bader – The Beverly Hillbillies
Adam Beach – Cadillac Girls
Kate Beckinsale – Much Ado About Nothing
Neve Campbell – The Dark
Dave Chappelle – Robin Hood: Men in Tights
Joe Chrest – King of the Hill
Thomas Haden Church – Tombstone
Cliff Curtis – The Piano
Aaron Eckhart – Slaughter of the Innocents
Noah Emmerich – Last Action Hero
Jon Favreau – Rudy
MC Hammer – Last Action Hero
Salma Hayek – Mi Vida Loca
Anne Heche – An Ambush of Ghosts
Terrence Howard – Who's the Man?
Albert and Allen Hughes (directors) – Menace II Society
Richard T. Jones – What's Love Got to Do with It
David Krumholtz – Life with Mikey
Jason Lee – Mi Vida Loca
Louis Lombardi – Amongst Friends
Domenick Lombardozzi – A Bronx Tale
Josh Lucas – Alive
John Carroll Lynch – Grumpy Old Men
Matthew McConaughey – My Boyfriend's Back
Tim Meadows – Coneheads
Brittany Murphy – Family Prayers
Bob Odenkirk – Wayne's World 2
Leland Orser – Cover Story
John Ortiz – Carlito's Way
Anna Paquin – The Piano
Trey Parker – Cannibal! The Musical
Parker Posey – Joey Breaker
Ryan Reynolds – Ordinary Magic
Denise Richards – Loaded Weapon 1
Johnathon Schaech – Sparrow
Garry Shandling – The Night We Never Met
Michael Shannon – Groundhog Day
Alicia Silverstone – The Crush
Jada Pinkett Smith – Menace II Society
Matt Stone – Cannibal! The Muscial
Mark Strong – CenturyAlanna Ubach – AirborneVince Vaughn – RudySteve Zahn – Rain Without ThunderRenée Zellweger – Dazed and Confused''

References

 
Film by year